Diana Liverman (born May 15, 1954, Accra, Ghana) is a retired Regents Professor of Geography and Development and past Director of the University of Arizona School of Geography, Development and Environment in the College of Social and Behavioral Sciences in Tucson, Arizona.

Liverman studies global environmental change and the impacts of climate on human society, including the effects of drought and famine on society, agriculture, food systems, and vulnerable populations.  
She is particularly concerned with adaptation interventions that address climate change, what makes them successful, and when they create or reinforce inequality.
Liverman examines the potential for reducing the effects of climate change and at the same time reaching the U.N.'s Sustainable Development Goals. In 2010, Liverman received the Founder's Medal of the Royal Geographical Society, for "encouraging, developing and promoting understanding of the human dimensions of climate change."

Liverman was a co-author of the Intergovernmental Panel on Climate Change (IPCC) October 8, 2018 Special Report on Global Warming of 1.5 °C.
Liverman was one of 19 scientists worldwide elected to the Earth Commission in 2019.
In 2020, Liverman was elected to the National Academy of Sciences and to the American Academy of Arts and Sciences.

Education
Diana Liverman was born May 15, 1954 in Accra, Ghana to British parents and grew up in the UK. 
Liverman earned her B.A. in geography from University College London (1976). She earned her M.A. from the University of Toronto, with a thesis on The coordination of response to drought in the Canadian Prairie Provinces (1979) with advisor Anne U. Whyte.

Liverman did her Ph.D. work at the University of California Los Angeles (UCLA), in collaboration with the  National Center for Atmospheric Research (NCAR) in Boulder, Colorado.  She worked with Steve Schneider from 1982-1985,  receiving her Ph.D. in geography from UCLA in 1984.
Her dissertation was The use of a simulation model in assessing the impacts of climate on the world food system, with advisors Werner Terjung and Stephen Schneider.

Career
Liverman taught geography at the University of Wisconsin-Madison where she was also affiliated with the Institute for Environmental Studies from 1984-1990. She taught at Penn State University from 1990-1996 where she was the Associate Director of the Earth System Science Center directed by Eric Barron. She moved to the University of Arizona in 1996 to become Director of Latin American Studies, retiring in 2022.

In 2003 she was appointed to the first Chair in Environmental Science at the University of Oxford and became Director of the Environmental Change Institute, a centre for research, teaching and outreach on the environment at Oxford University.

In 2009 Liverman returned to the University of Arizona as co-Director of the Institute of the Environment with Jonathan Overpeck. She remained in this position until 2016.  
As of July 2019, Liverman became director of the School of Geography and Development in the College of Social and Behavioral Sciences at the University of Arizona.

Liverman was a co-editor of the journal Annual Review of Environment and Resources from 2009 to 2015.
She has served on several national and international committees including the National Academy of Sciences' Committee on the Human Dimensions of Global Environmental Change (chair, 1995-1999) and the NAS Committee on America's Climate Choices. She also chaired the scientific advisory committee of the Inter-American Institute for Global Change Research (1998-2002), the Global Environmental Change and Food Systems (GECAFS) program (2006-) and the IHDP Earth System Governance Project. She co-chaired a transition team to create a new international research initiative, Future Earth, for an Alliance of international organizations that include ICSU, UNEP, and UNESCO.

Liverman has served as an author and committee member for multiple reports from the Intergovernmental Panel on Climate Change (IPCC), including the  October 8, 2018 Special Report on Global Warming of 1.5 °C.  Liverman was one of the scientists who "contributed substantially" to IPCC reports that led to the awarding of the Nobel Peace Prize to the IPCC in 2007. She has also reported on gender bias in the IPCC.

She serves on the board of a number of organizations including cultural and creative sustainability experts Julie's Bicycle.

Scholarship
Liverman has made many contributions to understanding of the human dimensions of global environmental change. Her publications and research grants deal with climate impacts, vulnerability and adaptation, climate change and food security, and climate policy, mitigation and justice especially in the developing world. 
She has a particular interest in the political ecology of environmental management in the Americas, especially in Mexico.

Liverman worked on the human impacts of drought as early as the 1980s, and the impacts of climate change on food systems using early climate modelling techniques and crop simulation models. Having identified the limitations to modelling approaches, fieldwork in Mexico followed, examining vulnerability to natural hazards in the agricultural sector, and the potential impacts of climatic change on food systems. Liverman has also examined the effects of neoliberalism on Latin American society and environmental regimes along the US-Mexico border.
 
In recent years she has focused on the international dimensions of climate policy and the growth of the new carbon economy, and is a frequent speaker and commentator on global climate issues. She is a co-author of influential papers on planetary boundaries and Earth system governance.

She has also led several major collaborative research projects, funded mainly by US and European agencies. In 2011 she was part of a group who briefed the Dalai Lama (2011) on climate change.

Internationally, Liverman has raised awareness of the importance of the social sciences in understanding impacts of environmental change.  
The Royal Geographical Society credits Liverman with "promoting the idea that climate impacts depend as much on vulnerability as the physical climate change, and especially showing how changing socioeconomic and political conditions have shifted the patterns of climate vulnerability".  Liverman has carried out some of the earliest academic analyses of adaptation and mitigation, examined connections between the global north and global south, and investigated the challenges of sustainable development in a changing world.

Honours
 2020, Member of the National Academy of Sciences
 2020, Member of the American Academy of Arts and Sciences
 2017, Alexander & Ilse Melamid Medal, American Geographical Society
 2014, Guggenheim Fellowship
 2014,  Presidential Achievement Award, Association of American Geographers
 2011, Distinguished Scholarship Honors from the Association of American Geographers
2010, Founder's Medal of the Royal Geographical Society
 1991, Mitchell Prize for Sustainable Development, Cynthia and George Mitchell Foundation

Key publications

Books
  (Diana Liverman, contributing author.)
 
 (Lead author, D. M. Liverman.)
 
 
 
  (Multiple editions).
  (D. M. Liverman and others).

Articles

References

American geographers
British geographers
Fellows of Linacre College, Oxford
University of Wisconsin–Madison faculty
Pennsylvania State University faculty
University of Arizona faculty
Alumni of University College London
University of Toronto alumni
University of California, Los Angeles alumni
1954 births
Living people
Political ecologists
Women geographers
Intergovernmental Panel on Climate Change lead authors
Recipients of the Royal Geographical Society Founder's Medal
Annual Reviews (publisher) editors
Climate change mitigation researchers